
Flavius Hannibalianus (also Hanniballianus; died September 337) was a member of the Constantinian dynasty, which ruled over the Roman Empire in the 4th century AD.

Hannibalianus was the son of Flavius Dalmatius, and thus nephew of Constantine the Great. Hannibalianus and his brother Dalmatius were educated at Tolosa by rhetor Exuperius (who is probably not to be identified with St. Exuperius).

In 320s, Constantine called Flavius Dalmatius and his sons to Constantinople. Hannibalianus married Constantine's elder daughter, Constantina, in 335, and was made nobilissimus. He and Constantina might had a daughter named Constantia, who would later marry to Memmius Vitrasius Orfitus and become mother of Rusticiana, wife of Quintus Aurelius Symmachus.

In occasion of the campaign of Constantine against the Sassanids (337), Hannibalianus was made Rex Regum et Ponticarum Gentium, "King of the Kings and of the Pontic People". Probably it was Constantine's intention to put Hannibalianus on the Pontic throne, after the defeat of the Persians.

The Persian campaign did not take place, because Constantine died in May 337. Hannibalianus died, as did his brother, in the purge of the imperial family that followed.

Notes

References

Primary sources
Ammianus Marcellinus, Rerum Gestarum XXXI
Epitome de Caesaribus
Zosimus, Historia Nova

Secondary sources

 DiMaio, Michael, "Hannibalianus Rex Regum (335-337 A.D)", in DIR

337 deaths
Constantinian dynasty
4th-century Romans
Flavii
Year of birth unknown
Ancient Roman murder victims
Nobilissimi